Amporn Hyapha (born 19 May 1985) is a member of the Thailand women's national volleyball team.

Career
Hyapha played with Bangkok Glass in 2017–18 Thailand League (Second leg)

She is on the list 2019 Korea-Thailand all star super match competition.

She played in 2019 Asian Women's Club Volleyball Championship with Supreme Chonburi on loan.

Personal life
Amporn Hyapha married Somporn Wannaprapa in 2014.

Clubs
  Sang Som (2005–2006)
  Phuket (2006)
  Federbrau (2008–2009)
  Ereğli Belediye (2009–2010)
  Jakarta Electric PLN (2010–2012)
  Sisaket (2010–2011)
  Nonthaburi (2011–2012)
  Igtisadchi Baku (2012–2013)
  Jakarta Pertamina (2013–2014)
  Nonthaburi (2013–2014)
  Cagayan Valley (2014)
  Nonthaburi (2015–2016)
  Nakhon Ratchasima (2016–2017)
  Power Smashers (2017)
  Bangkok Glass (2018)
  Tacloban Fighting Warays (2018)
  Nakhon Ratchasima (2018–2019)
 Diamond Food (2019–)

Awards

Individuals
 2005 Asian Club Championship – "Best Server"
 2005 Asian Championship – "Best Server"
 2006 Thailand League – "Best Scorer"
 2006 Thailand League "Best Server"
 2010 Asian Games – "Best Server"

Clubs
 2009 Indonesia Proliga –  Champion, with Jakarta Electric PLN
 2010 Indonesia Proliga –  Runner-up, with Jakarta Electric PLN
 2011 Indonesia Proliga –   Champion, with Jakarta Electric PLN
 2012–13 Azerbaijan Super League –  Runner-up, with Igtisadchi Baku
 2014 Shakey's V-league –  Champion, with Cagayan Valley
 2018–19 Thailand League –  Champion, with Nakhon Ratchasima
 2009 Asian Club Championship –  Champion, with Federbrau
 2010 Asian Club Championship –  Champion, with Federbrau
 2011 Asian Club Championship –  Champion, with Chang
 2012 Asian Club Championship –  Bronze medal, with Chang
 2019 Asian Club Championship –  Runner-up, with Supreme Chonburi

Royal decorations
 2013 -  Commander (Third Class) of The Most Exalted Order of the White Elephant
 2010 -  Commander (Third Class) of The Most Admirable Order of the Direkgunabhorn
 2005 -  	Member (Fifth Class) of The Most Admirable Order of the Direkgunabhorn

References

External links

Living people
1985 births
Amporn Hyapha
Amporn Hyapha
Amporn Hyapha
Volleyball players at the 2002 Asian Games
Volleyball players at the 2006 Asian Games
Volleyball players at the 2010 Asian Games
Amporn Hyapha
Amporn Hyapha
Universiade medalists in volleyball
Amporn Hyapha
Southeast Asian Games medalists in volleyball
Competitors at the 2001 Southeast Asian Games
Competitors at the 2003 Southeast Asian Games
Competitors at the 2005 Southeast Asian Games
Competitors at the 2007 Southeast Asian Games
Competitors at the 2009 Southeast Asian Games
Competitors at the 2011 Southeast Asian Games
Competitors at the 2013 Southeast Asian Games
Amporn Hyapha
Amporn Hyapha
Medalists at the 2013 Summer Universiade
Amporn Hyapha
Thai expatriate sportspeople in Turkey
Thai expatriate sportspeople in the Philippines
Expatriate volleyball players in Indonesia
Expatriate volleyball players in Turkey
Expatriate volleyball players in Azerbaijan